Erez is a kibbutz in southwestern Israel.

The kibbutz was founded in 1949 and moved to its current location in 1950, where it was built at the site of the depopulated Palestinian Arab village of Dimra. In 2019, it had a population of 558.

History
Erez is named after the first group that settled the kibbutz, who were members of the Noar HaOved from Petah Tikva. They originally settled in the area of Or HaNer in 1949; however, in 1950, they were resettled in its current location at the site of Dimra, a former Arab village of British Palestine.

Economy
The kibbutz has three main industries: agriculture (arable and fruit farming as well as animal husbandry), manufacturing (Erez Thermoplastics Products manufactures plastic-covered materials), and research and development.

See also
Erez Crossing, a border crossing point between Israel and the Palestinian Gaza Strip

References

External links
Official website 

Kibbutzim
Kibbutz Movement
Populated places established in 1949
Populated places established in 1950
Gaza envelope
Populated places in Southern District (Israel)
1949 establishments in Israel
1950 establishments in Israel